The Elevala River is a river in southwestern Papua New Guinea.

See also
List of rivers of Papua New Guinea
Kamula–Elevala languages

References

Rivers of Papua New Guinea